Euxoa biformata is a moth of the family Noctuidae. It is found from British Columbia, south to California.

References 

Euxoa
Moths of North America
Moths described in 1910